The 1909–10 season was the seventeenth season in which Dundee competed at a Scottish national level, playing in Division One, where they would finish in 6th place. Dundee would also compete in the Scottish Cup, where they would win their first, and to date only, Scottish Cup, their first ever major honour. Playing 10 games, including 5 replays, the Dark Blues would lift the trophy after defeating Clyde at the third attempt 2–1 on 20 April 1910 at Ibrox Park in front of 24,000. Dundee would change up their kit slightly, returning to a buttoned shirt and adding three white hoops to their socks.

Scottish Division One 

Statistics provided by Dee Archive.

League table

Scottish Cup 

Statistics provided by Dee Archive.

Player Statistics 
Statistics provided by Dee Archive

|}

See also 

 List of Dundee F.C. seasons

References 

 

Dundee F.C. seasons
Dundee